Kevin Elliott (born December 21, 1988) is a former gridiron football wide receiver. He was signed by the Jacksonville Jaguars as an undrafted free agent in 2012 and was also a member of the Buffalo Bills, Brooklyn Bolts (FXFL), Toronto Argonauts, Hamilton Tiger-Cats, Ottawa Redblacks, BC Lions, and Edmonton Eskimos / Football Team of the Canadian Football League (CFL). He played college football at Florida A&M.

College career
Elliott played at Florida A&M from 2007 to 2011.

Professional career

Jacksonville Jaguars
Elliott was signed by the Jacksonville Jaguars following the 2012 NFL Draft. He was released on December 14, 2012.

Buffalo Bills
Elliott was signed to the Buffalo Bills' on December 18, 2012. On August 16, 2013, he suffered a torn ACL during the second preseason game against the Minnesota Vikings. On August 18, 2013, Bills' head coach Doug Marrone announced that Elliott will be placed on injured reserve and will miss the rest of the 2013 season. He was waived on August 18, 2014.

Toronto Argonauts

Elliott was signed by the Toronto Argonauts (CFL) on April 9, 2015. Elliot had an impressive first season in the CFL playing in 16 of 18 regular season games and amassing 50 receptions for 642 yards with 8 touchdowns. Elliott played in 8 of the Argos first 14 games, missing 6 due to injury. Following a Week 15 loss the Argos front office decided to release four of their wide receivers on the same day including Kevin Elliott. Reports suggest the four wide receivers were not committed to the Argos and had been a source of division in the locker room for some time. In 8 games for the Argos Elliott caught 23 passes for 294 yards with 2 touchdowns.

Hamilton Tiger-Cats 
A week after being released Elliot signed with divisional rival Hamilton Tiger-Cats (CFL). He played three games to wrap up the season, posting 15 receptions for 220 yards and a touchdown. On March 2, 2017 Elliot re-signed with the Ti-Cats after being a free agent for three weeks after his contract expired on February 14, 2017. He was subsequently released on August 8, 2017, after the Tiger-Cats posted an 0–6 record to start the season. Limited production was believed to be a factor in his release, catching only 4 passes for 54 yards in two games in 2017. The production numbers he put up were contrary to his production numbers in his three games with the team in 2016, Other reasons that may have contributed to his release from the team were not publicized.

Ottawa Redblacks 
Within a month of being released by the Hamilton Tiger-Cats, Elliott was signed by the Ottawa Redblacks to provide support for the organization after an injury to former Argos teammate, Kenny Shaw. He played in a single game with the organization, registering one catch for 13 yards against the Winnipeg Blue Bombers in their September 22 game. As at January 15, 2018, Elliott was not listed as a member of the Ottawa Redblacks roster.

BC Lions 
On May 9, 2018, the BC Lions announced they had signed Elliott to a contract along with five other wide receivers. He was released after playing 5 games with the Leos on September 12, 2018, recording 176 receiving yards and a touchdown on 14 receptions on the year.

Edmonton Eskimos / Football Team
Elliott signed a contract extension through the 2021 season on January 11, 2021. He retired from football on June 23, 2021.

References

External links
Florida A&M Rattlers bio
Jacksonville Jaguars bio
Buffalo Bills bio
Toronto Argonauts bio

1988 births
Living people
Sportspeople from Fayetteville, North Carolina
Colonial High School alumni
Players of American football from North Carolina
Players of American football from Orlando, Florida
Players of Canadian football from Orlando, Florida
Players of Canadian football from North Carolina
American football wide receivers
Florida A&M University alumni
Florida A&M Rattlers football players
Jacksonville Jaguars players
Buffalo Bills players
Brooklyn Bolts players
American players of Canadian football
Toronto Argonauts players
Hamilton Tiger-Cats players
Canadian football wide receivers
Ottawa Redblacks players
BC Lions players
Edmonton Elks players